Thierry Fortineau (9 February 1953 – 8 February 2006) was a French actor.

Fortineau was born in Nantes. In the year of 1990, he was nominated for a César Award for Most Promising Actor at the 15th César Awards for his role in Comédie d'été. The award, however, went to Yvan Attal. In 1994, he was nominated for a Molière Award for Best Actor for his role in Le Visiteur.

Thierry Fortineau is the father of actress Jade Fortineau, born in 1991, from his relationship with Dutch actress Maruschka Detmers.  
He lost his battle against cancer in Paris one day before his 53rd birthday, and was interred at the Père Lachaise Cemetery.

Selected filmography
 Le Brasier (1991)
 La Fille de l'air (1992)

1953 births
2006 deaths
Actors from Nantes
French male film actors
French male stage actors
French male television actors